New York's 29th State Senate district is one of 63 districts in the New York State Senate. It has been represented by Democrat José M. Serrano since 2005.

Geography
District 29 stretches across a convoluted section of the South Bronx and upper Manhattan, as well as Randalls Island, Roosevelt Island, and Central Park. The neighborhoods it covers include Mott Haven, Melrose, Highbridge, Morris Heights, East Harlem, Yorkville, and a small part of the Upper West Side.

The district overlaps New York's 10th, 12th, 13th, and 15th congressional districts, and with the 67th, 68th, 69th, 73rd, 76th, 77th, 84th, and 86th districts of the New York State Assembly.

Recent election results

2020

2018

2016

2014

2012

Federal results in District 29

References

29